Edith Schreiber-Aujame (April 5, 1919  December 31, 1998) was a Franco-American architect and urban planner. She was born in Rymanów, Poland and died in France.

Biography 

In 1926, her family emigrated from Poland and settled in New York. Later, in 1937, she attended the University of Wisconsin, Madison, where she earned a BA in History and Economics in 1940. She then attended the American University simultaneously, where she earned a Master of Economics in 1941, and was a research assistant in Economics for the federal government in Washington D.C. until 1942. She attended a different school from 1942 to 1945, where she was a student at the Graduate School of Design of Harvard University in Cambridge, near Boston. Her director was Walter Gropius and her workshop teacher Marcel Breuer.

From 1946 to 1947, after graduating, she left the United States for Europe. She entered the studio Le Corbusier at 35 rue de Sèvres in Paris. She worked under the direction of Vladimir Bodiansky and Charlotte Perriand, on the details of the Cité Radieuse of Marseille. She met the French architect Roger Aujame there as well, who would later become her husband.

City planning 

In 1953, at the CIAM9 (International Congress of Modern Architecture) in Aix-en-Provence, within the CIAM-Paris Group, she presented, an analysis that brought together the essential features of the Paris region and corresponded to the general direction of the group's "Charter for a habitat for the greatest number." The CIAM-Paris group consisted of Roger and Edith Aujame Guy Rottier, Denise Creswell, Gérard Thurnauer, Pierre Riboulet, Jean-Louis Véret, Nicos and Pirkko Chatzidakis, Guy Le Lann and Jean Marcot (though Péré-Lahaille, Préveral and Raccoursier also contributed to this study).

Together with Roger Aujame, she was also involved with:

 the program and realization of an urban planning exhibition of five twinned cities in the town of Boulogne-Billancourt.
 the program and the renovation plan of the C and D sectors of Boulogne-Billancourt.
 a draft multiple combination collective housing  project, which would be exhibited in the Paris region and at the CIAM 10  in Dubrovnik in 1956.
 Urban studies:
 Study of the development prospects of the town of Saint Lunaire (Ille et Vilaine) with the participation of residents and elected officials.
 Experimental research on housing in rural areas in southern Finistère in order to achieve a more suitable habitat.

Architecture and habitat 

In 1947-1948 she worked for the architecture studio of Nelson Gilbert and Sebillotte on the project to build the Saint Lô hospital (intensive care service, nurses’ rooms, façades).

In 1949–1950, her husband Roger Aujame having been sent by Le Corbusier to New York to work in the design team on the site of the United Nations Secretariat, Edith Aujame worked in Skidmore Owings and Merrill’s  architectural firm in New York. Her son Luc was born in New York.

Between 1950 and 1953, back in France, she worked in the architectural offices of J. L. Gauthier, R. Lecaisne, Marcel Lods, and Pingusson. In 1952 she helped create a group of young architects and engineers with Roger Aujame who would be recognized by the CIAM (International Congress of Modern Architecture) under the group name "CIAM-Paris" contributing an analysis of housing conditions in Boulogne-Billancourt.

Between 1953 and 1960, she worked on her own, either alone or in association.

In 1954, she was part of ATIC (Atelier pour l'industrialisation de la construction -Workshop for building industrialization) with Roger Aujame around Jean Prouvé, Maurice Silvy, Gérard Thurnauer, Pierre Riboulet, Michel Bataille, Pirko and Nicos Chatzidakis. In this context she was involved in designing and implementing plans for 190 housing units for Abbé Pierre (Emmaus) in Argenteuil, whose construction would be continued by Roger Aujame.

In 1955, she developed and designed the plans and monitored the implementation of a condominium called "Immeuble Liberté," on Bartholdi St in Boulogne-Billancourt, with their own apartment set up on the top floor.

She also designed and monitored the implementation of a house in Maisons-Laffitte.

Between 1961 and 1965, Roger Aujame worked for the United Nations in Afghanistan, on a mission to work on the city plan of Kabul where she also lived. During this period she worked by herself on:
 Landscape plan of Kabul University: installation of playgrounds, drainage system, choice of species, program, planning and execution.
 Program and design of an production center for educational material for the Ministry of Education in Kabul.
 Agricultural Training Centre, for the Ministry of Agriculture, near Kabul.
 Design of libraries within a number of ministries and the Red Crescent, on behalf of Asia Foundation.
 Horizontal residential city Project for the Bank-i-Milli in Kabul.
 Program and plan for the Surgery Service, Ali Abad hospital
 Plans and construction of houses and buildings with improved traditional or modern techniques.
 Organization of a handicraft center in the old city of Kabul.
 In collaboration with Roger Aujame and Mr. Shafiq Md.:
 Project for an urban code for the city of Kabul.

In 1968–1969, she taught courses in architecture at the School of Fine Arts in Montpellier.

Between 1973 and 1985, she was part of the architectural firm Develop-Build-Equip (A.B.E.) with architects and urban planners Claude Bensimon and Pierre Talou. In this context she has been associated with numerous research studies or urban planning and architectural designs.

Architectural work 

She was involved in the development of various buildings in the town of Saint Lunaire: Mixed housing for seniors and families, of joined and stacked townhouses. Study and realization of collective  and of the gymnastics club Foyer Soleil for seniors of Saint Lunaire. Construction of various external landscaped areas.
Research on school plans for combinable functional areas
Design and production, in association with the B.E.T. ATIC Computer Center of the Breton Centre for Agricultural Mutual Insurance (CIBAMA) in Le Rheu, in Ille et Vilaine.
Quiberon (Morbihan): old class C.E.S. redevelopment in kindergarten, designed and furnished with the participation of teachers and the Inspector of Education.
Study and implementation of the School Group of Etablette (18 classes) in Saint Brieuc, Côtes d'Armor).
Quiberon (Morbihan): design and production of the extension of the public primary school with the participation of teachers.
Mauron (Morbihan): Redevelopment of a school in kindergarten (with the participation of teachers and the Inspector of Education).
Carhaix (Finistère): Design and manufacture of primary school Persivien (12 classes), with Jean Coignat project architect,
Etel (Morbihan): Restructuring and extension for 170 students of the Middle school of Etel (400 places), with the participation of teachers.

Education and architectural consequences 

In 1969, she co-founded and chaired the Association pour l’Environnement Pédagogique (A.E.P. -Association for Educational Environment). Association pour l'Environnement Pédagogique, composed of educators, architects, planners, economists, and biologists, whose purpose was and is to promote buildings and equipment adapted to differentiated learning and social and cultural practices, to develop research, experimentation and the dissemination of knowledge in this field, in any country or region that manifests the desire. ( Association pour l'Environnement Pédagogique ). The co-founders of the association are Henri Bonneville, Claude Bensimon and Jean Hassenforder, Ruth and Bernard Kohn, Suzanne Saisse, and Mion Vallotton who were joined late by  Nancy Magaud, Roger Couteller, Muguette Berger, Joseph Morfoisse and Françoise Hélard.

Between 1969 and 1985, she was actively involved in:

Volunteer activities within the A.E.P. were : Briefings, lectures, films and slides, travel organization studies, articles, exhibitions, and whose theme was the impact of modern methods of education on school architecture in France and abroad (experimental school project Chenini-Gabes, Tunisia)
Studies and research commissioned by the Ministry of Education by public establishments or of local councils: Programming with the participation of teachers and staff in some cases students and many school groups parents, colleges, cultural equipment and sports:
Study of the educational project and the architectural program of the school of Saint Merri in Paris, following the construction of the Beaubourg Centre, with the participation of teachers. Eurocentre Paris 6th study and development of a center of learning of languages, Organizing study,  educational project and architectural program of a community integrated educational complex for the Quiberon Peninsula, Morbihan, including a CES, a CET (General and Technical Middle schools), a leisure center, a library, an adult training and continuing education and sports center. Innovative School group in the new town of Saint Quentin en Yvelines, District of St. Tropez: implantation opportunity study of an international comprehensive school, continuing education center for 13 towns in the Var.
Study of the educational project and the architectural program of a school group of 18 classes in Saint Brieuc, Etablette (Côtes d'Armor), with the participation of teachers, staff and parents, Organisation in accordance with the Ecole Normale Côtes d'Armor, a one-year training program for future teachers of the school group.
Survey on behalf of the Ministry of Cultural Affairs (CORDA) on schools engaged in innovative teaching in France.
Various studies in Brest:
Analysis of collective utilities on the Right Bank
Architectural programming of the Maison des associations  (Community Center) with scientific  features of the Quatre Moulins
Architectural programming for the transformation of the Sanquer school into  a Community Center for Breton culture
Educational project and architectural program for the renovation of a school on the Left Bank.
Architectural programming for the restructuring of a Maison des Associations on the Left Bank
Study of the operation and architectural program for the renovation of the National Institute for Young Deaf (I.N.J.S.) in Paris
Study of the educational project and the architectural program for the renovation of the Middle school of Etel, Morbihan, with the participation of teachers and staff.
Study of the educational project and the architectural program for the construction of a school complex in Persivien, in Carhaix, Finistère, with the participation of teachers, staff and parents.
Educational project and architectural planning for the expansion of the experimental school of Chenini Gabès in Tunisia - workshops, library, preschool premises- as part of the decentralized cooperation Gabès- Cötes d'Armor.

Trade shows

At the Union des Artistes Modernes, participation to the first two exhibitions "Useful Forms" in Salon des Arts Ménagers, the Grand Palais, 1951–1952
Urban Planning Exhibition in Boulogne Billancourt of 5 twinned  cities, 1954
Exhibition of the Ministry of Agriculture at the Kabul Fair (Afghanistan), 1962
Stand of the United Nations at the  Kabul Fair 1962
Afghan Stand at the Fair of Paris 1965
Simulation area for open space classes, realized in the old building of the Ecole Saint Merri in Paris 1971
"Spaces for learning," traveling exhibition and slides for the new town of Évry, the Siamco (Tour Montparnasse), company and several CRDP (Regional Centre for Pedagogical Documentation of Bretagne) 1977

Publications

Issue on architecture and urbanism in the US - Bulletin  of the "U.S. Information Service," US Embassy in Paris – 1954
"Architecture and Urbanism Soviet 20s by Anatole Kopp" in le Carré Bleu 1967-4http://www.lecarrebleu.eu,
Collaboration with Le Carré Bleu (International Architecture Review) before 1968, then member of the editorial board from 1968 to 1998 Le Carré Bleu.
"New schools in England" in Les Cahiers Pédagogiques, 1971
"Architecture and pedagogical innovation" in Education and Development No. 86, May–June 1973
"The school in the history of modern architecture" in Le Carré Bleu 1979-3 Le Carré Bleu,
"Anatole Kopp is no longer" in Le Carré Bleu 1990-2 Le Carré Bleu,
"About Paris" in Le Carré Bleu 1990-2 Le Carré Bleu,
"Ghettos and Suburbs" Le Carré Bleu 1990-4 Le Carré Bleu,
Translator  of Le Corbusier "Precisions on the present state of architecture and city planning" MIT Press 1991

For the A.E.P. 

"Educational innovation, architectural consequences" translation of the booklet Educational Facilities Laboratory, 1973
"Furnishing a schoolhouse" edited and distributed by the C.A.U.E. (Council of Architecture, Planning and Environment of the Côtes d'Armor) and C.D.D.P. (Departmental Centre for Educational Documentation  of the Côtes d'Armor) 1983
"Setting up a Library Documentary Centre", edited by grants from the DRAC Bretagne (Regional Direction of Cultural Affairs) of the Cultural Institute of Bretagne and C.D.D.P.  Côtes d'Armor), 1994

References 

1919 births
1998 deaths
20th-century French architects
American University alumni
French women architects
Harvard Graduate School of Design alumni
University of Wisconsin–Madison College of Letters and Science alumni
20th-century French women
People from Rymanów
Polish emigrants to the United States